Bapatla is a city and District headquarters of Bapatla district in the  Indian state of Andhra Pradesh. It is a municipality and the mandal headquarters of Bapatla mandal of Bapatla revenue division. The nearest towns and cities to Bapatla are Chirala, Ponnur, Tenali and Guntur of 17 km, 22 km, 50 km and 53 km respectively.

Etymology 

The town was formerly known as Bhavapattana, Bhavapuri, Bhavapattu and Bhavapatta. The names were derived from the Bhavanarayana Temple located in the town. Later, these names were transformed to the present name of Bapatla.

The temple was constructed in 1465 by a chola king named Krimikantha Chola, and was later restored.

Geography 

Climate 

Hot summers and cool winters are observed due to its proximity to the coast of Bay of Bengal. It receives both South west monsoon and North-east monsoon as well. It is most affected by the cyclonic storms that occur on the east coast.

Demographics 

 Census of India, the town had a population of 100300 with 98,216 households. The total population constituted 54,385 males and 5

6,392 females  —a sex ratio of 1058 females per 1000 males, higher than the national average of 940 per 1000. 6,182 children were in the age group of 0–6 years, of which 3,156 were boys and 3,026 were girls—a ratio of 959 per 1000. The average literacy rate stood at 80.67% with 52,106 literates, significantly higher than the national average of 73.00%.

Governance

Bapatla district collectorate 

The very first Bapatla district  Collector is Smt K.Vijaya krishnan IAS.

 2022-

Civic administration 

Bapatla Municipality was established in 1951. It oversees the civic needs of the town like, water supply, sewage, and garbage collection.

Utility services 

Kommamuru and Poondla channels of the Krishna Western Delta system provide irrigation water to Bapatla and the surrounding areas.

Politics 

Bapatla, being a part of Bapatla mandal, falls under Bapatla assembly constituency of Andhra Pradesh Legislative Assembly. Kona Raghupathi of YSR Congress Party is the present MLA of the constituency. The assembly segment is in turn a part of Bapatla (SC) lok sabha constituency and the present MP is Nandhigam Suresh of the YSR Congress Party.

Key points 

Bapatla district collectorate - smt K Vijaya Krishnan IAS.

Bapatla Sub-Division of police - A.Srinivas.

Member of Parliament - Nandhigam Suresh.

Member of the Legislative Assembly - Kona Raghupathi.

Economy 

Aquaculture and agriculture are the main occupations of the coastal areas of the town. Aquaculture involves pisciculture and the farming is dominant with paddy cultivation. The Cairn India have conducted oil drilling onshore of Bapatla which is a part of KG basin stretch.

Tourism also plays a role in generating revenue with the presence of Suryalanka Beach near the town, operated by the Andhra Pradesh Tourism Development Corporation.

Culture 

 The Clock Tower, built in 1948, was demolished for road extension and started to be rebuilt in December 2017.
 The town has various religious structures depicting the presence of different worshipers, such as Bhavanarayana Temple and Centenary Baptist Zion Church
 The Suryalanka Beach connected by the Beach Road of the town hosts the Bhavapuri Beach Festival every year.

Memorials 

The Edward Coronation Memorial Town Hall was built in 1905 in coronation of the then Emperor of India, Edward VII.
 On the road leading to the Suryalanka beach is a Town Hall in this coastal town. Constructed to commemorate the coronation of Edward VII, Emperor of India, the Town Hall which still retains its shape after 113 years, continues to hold the centre stage in the town and is a place of recreation. The Hall was constructed with public donations without any assistance from the government or local funds. The Edward Coronation Memorial Town Hall was inaugurated by Broodie, then Guntur district Collector on July 17, 1905. The Hall witnessed many historic moments including the first Andhra Conference in 1913 which paved the way for the creation of a movement for linguistic States. It hosted the First Andhra Provincial Conference in 1913 where a clarion call was given for a separate Telugu State. All important meetings of public nature were held in the compound and it had become a hub for all cultural, literary and political activities. Leaders like Mahatma Gandhi, Pandit Jawaharlal Nehru, Babu Rajendra Prasad, Jayaprakash Narayan, Dange and many other Andhra leaders visited it and addressed people. The Victoria Diamond Jubilee Club and News Paper Club started in 1896 in Bapatla were merged with the Town Hall in 1905.

Transport 

Until 1993, Vijaya Krishna Bus Service was the sole operator in Bapatla. APSRTC started operations in 1994 with its bus services to various parts of the state from Bapatla bus station. The town has frequent buses to Vijayawada, Guntur, Ponnur, Repalle and Chirala.

 The National Highway 216 passes through the town, which connects Digamarru and Ongole. State Highway 48 also known as Guntur-Bapatla-Chirala (G.B.C) Road passes through Ponnur and connects the town with the district headquarters, Guntur.
 Bapatla railway station is located on the Howrah-Chennai main line of Indian Railways. It is a –A category station and was recognised as an Adarsh station in the Vijayawada railway division of South Central Railway zone.

Education and research 

The primary and secondary school education is imparted by government, aided and private schools, under the School Education Department of the state. The mediums of instruction followed by different schools are English and Telugu.

The town has many schools, colleges and universities. The Agricultural College was established on 11 July 1945 by Government of Composite Madras State. It is the oldest of all the colleges under Acharya N. G. Ranga Agricultural University. Bapatla Engineering College, College of Agricultural Engineering under Acharya N. G. Ranga Agricultural University, College of Food Science and Technology, Bapatla Polytechnic College, and Bapatla College of Arts & Sciences are other prominent ones.

Research and defense establishments 

An automatic weather station of India Meteorological Department is located in the town which records the temperatures. BPT 5204 (rice variety of Sona Masuri), BPT 2270 (Bhavapuri Sannalu) and BPT 2231 (Akshaya) were developed at this rice research unit. There are also a number of research institutes of this agricultural university, such as the AICRP on Betelvine, and a cashew research station.

Air Force base 

Suryalanka Indian Air Force base on the shore of the Bay of Bengal is located near Bapatla. The base carries out activities such as testing missiles and guided weapon firing range.

Notable people 

 Pawan Kalyan, Indian actor

See also 

 List of urban local bodies in Andhra Pradesh

References 

Towns in Guntur district
Mandal headquarters in Guntur district